Ryan Anthony Klesko (born June 12, 1971) is a former Major League Baseball first baseman and corner outfielder who played for the Atlanta Braves, San Diego Padres and San Francisco Giants. He attended Westminster High School in Westminster, California.

Early life
Klesko was born on June 12, 1971, in Westminster, California. His father was an oilfields worker whom Klesko lost at a young age. His mother, Lorene, worked at an aerospace parts company in Santa Ana and helped Klesko learn to play baseball. When he was nine, she dug a pitcher's mound for him in his backyard. She enrolled him in pitching school with Ron Lefebvre and put on catcher's gear herself to catch Klesko three times a week. 

Klesko attended Westminster High School, where even though he hit a lot of home runs, he starred as a pitcher, throwing a ninety-two mile per hour fastball and pitching for the USA Junior Olympic team. He strained a ligament pitching for the junior team at 17, though, and concentrated on hitting thereafter.  Klesko signed a letter of intent to play college baseball at Arizona State, but he never did so, instead signing with the Atlanta Braves after the team selected him in the fifth round of the 1989 Major League Baseball (MLB) Draft.

Professional career
Klesko hit a home run in three consecutive World Series games against the Cleveland Indians in Games 3, 4, and 5 of the 1995 World Series. In Game 3, he hit a solo shot off of Charles Nagy in the seventh inning of a 7–6 loss. The Game 4 home run, another solo shot (this time off Ken Hill) put the Braves up 1–0 in the sixth; they would win the game 5–2. In Game 5, his ninth-inning two-run home run to right field off José Mesa was almost caught by his mother; Klesko wound up trading the man who caught it an autographed Greg Maddux baseball for it. The Braves lost that game 5–4, but they beat the Indians for the fourth time in the sixth game to become World Series champions.

In , Klesko hit .300 with 29 home runs and 95 RBI, and collected career-highs in hits (162) and doubles (39). Defensively he shuttled around the outfield and first base. In his career, Klesko compiled a .370 on-base percentage with a .500 slugging average, for an .870 OPS. His .525 slugging percentage as a Brave ranks fourth all-time among the team's career leaders, ahead of Eddie Mathews. His .886 OPS as a Brave ranks him fifth among Braves' all-time leaders.

Klesko missed nearly the entire  season due to major shoulder surgery. He returned on September 21, drawing a walk as a pinch-hitter in his first plate appearance. On December 19, 2006, Klesko signed a one-year contract with the San Francisco Giants. Klesko announced his retirement from baseball on April 18, .

Off the field
As of 2019, Klesko serves as a pre-game and post-game analyst for the Atlanta Braves on Fox Sports South and SportsSouth. Klesko has also served as the Padres' spokesperson for the Make-A-Wish Foundation, hosting Make-A-Wish children for batting practice, a pregame ceremony and a ballgame each home stand. Through his Klesko's Korner program, he has regularly provided Padres tickets to children and families facing cancer for the last four years, and he has also been a leading supporter of the Padres Scholars program. Klesko was honored June 19, 2014 with his induction into the National Polish-American Sports Hall of Fame in Troy, Michigan.

See also

 List of Major League Baseball career home run leaders

References

External links

1971 births
Living people
People from Westminster, California
Baseball players from California
National League All-Stars
Atlanta Braves players
San Diego Padres players
San Francisco Giants players
Major League Baseball first basemen
Major League Baseball left fielders
American people of Polish descent